Tropeang Peay is a 1970 Khmer film  starring Kong Som Eun and Vichara Dany.

Novel
The film was originally written as a novel by Ly Taly in the late 1960s before it was produced as a film in 1970.

Remakes
The film was remade in 2007 by KPV Productions. The 2007 version stars Heng Bunleap and Danh Monika.

Cast
Kong Som Eun
Vichara Dany
Bun Chan Sophea

Soundtrack

References

1970 films
Cambodian drama films